Patrick Cannon Levis (born January 23, 1982) is an American actor, best known for playing Peter in the Disney Channel Original Movie Brink!, Jack Phillips on the Disney Channel series So Weird, and Reed on The Fresh Beat Band.

Biography 

Ever since he was little, acting was his passion. He started acting in several commercials, and by the age of twelve, he had a role in the original cast of the Broadway play "Big: The Musical." After this he starred in Brink! (1998) (TV), a Disney Channel original movie, and shortly after was cast in the role of Jack Phillips in So Weird (1999). Patrick also made another Disney Channel movie with Frankie Muniz called Miracle in Lane 2 (2000) (TV) and also starred in the TV movie Inside the Osmonds (2001) (TV), where he played Donny Osmond. In 2001, Patrick was cast in the role of Grant Stage in the sitcom Maybe It's Me (2001), which aired on the WB. In 2007, he was cast to play Drew Simpson in Love's Unfolding Dream, a Hallmark Channel movie.

He was also in a Christian progressive folk band called Least of These, which he founded in 2004 with his brother and sister, who played drums and bass, respectively.  In 2013, he released his solo album Extravagant God.

Filmography

References

External links
 
 Least of These
 Index

1982 births
20th-century American male actors
21st-century American male actors
American male child actors
American male film actors
American male television actors
Living people
People from Silver Spring, Maryland